The surname Threepwood may refer to: 

 Lands of Threepwood, an estate in North Ayrshire, Scotland
 The Threepwood family, characters from the Blandings Castle stories of P. G. Wodehouse
 Clarence Threepwood, 9th Earl of Emsworth, head of the aristocratic Threepwood family
 Freddie Threepwood, second son of Lord Emsworth
 Galahad Threepwood, younger brother of Lord Emsworth
 Guybrush Threepwood, central character of the Monkey Island series of computer games

See also
 Threapwood, a village in Cheshire
 Fleetwood (disambiguation)